Charlotte von Brandenstein (1754–1813) was a German composer. She was born in Schorndorf and studied in Mannheim with Abbe Vogler. She died in Berlin.

Von Brandenstein composed mainly for piano and violin. Selected works include:
Clavier Sonate in D

References

1754 births
1813 deaths
People from Schorndorf
People from the Duchy of Württemberg
18th-century classical composers
19th-century classical composers
Women classical composers
19th-century German composers
18th-century German composers
19th-century women composers
18th-century women composers